Kick In is a 1931 American pre-Code drama film produced by Famous Players-Lasky and distributed by Paramount Pictures. The film, based on the 1914 Broadway play by Willard Mack which had starred John Barrymore, was directed by Richard Wallace and starred the legendary Clara Bow in her last film for Paramount Pictures.

The movie was filmed twice in the silent era: a version filmed in 1917 by Pathé and a 1922 version released by Paramount. The 1922 film, lost for over 80 years, was discovered to have been in the Gosfilmofond archive in Moscow and returned to the U.S. in 2010.

The 1931 version of Kick In is currently controlled by Universal Studios, who own or control all Paramount films made between 1929 and 1949. The 1931 Kick In has (as of 2011) never been broadcast on television.

Cast
Clara Bow as Molly Hewes
Regis Toomey as Chick Hewes
Wynne Gibson as Myrtle Sylvester
Juliette Compton as Piccadilly Bessie
Leslie Fenton as Charlie
James Murray as Benny LaMarr
Donald Crisp as Police Commissioner Harvey
Paul Hurst as Detective Whip Fogarty
Wade Boteler as Detective Jack Davis

uncredited
Edward LeSaint as Purnell, Chick's Boss
J. Carrol Naish as Sam
Ben Taggart as Detective Johnson
Phil Tead as Burke, Reporter

Adaptation
A one-hour radio adaptation was presented on Lux Radio Theatre on April 6, 1936, featuring Edmund Lowe and Ann Sothern. It was the show's one-hundredth broadcast.

References

External links

Poster for Kick In

1931 films
American films based on plays
Films directed by Richard Wallace
Famous Players-Lasky films
1931 drama films
Remakes of American films
Sound film remakes of silent films
American black-and-white films
American drama films
Paramount Pictures films
1930s American films
1930s English-language films